Sekolah Menengah Kebangsaan (SMK) Vivekananda or SMKV, also known as SMK VIVE among the local students, is one of the oldest schools in Brickfields, a neighbourhood of Kuala Lumpur, Malaysia. It was previously known as Sekolah Menengah Tamil Vivekananda.

History
SMKV was officiated By Tunku Abdul Rahman Putra Al-Haj, the first Prime Minister of Malaysia.

Principals
 Mr M T Pillai               1960-1962
 Mrs I. G. Yogam             1962-1964
 Mr K. Purushotamam          1964-1979
 Mr G. Ramalingam            1980-1983
 Mr B. A. Deimudu            1983-1988
 Mrs Padmavathy Chee         1988-1989
 Mr R. Ganesan               1989-1998
 Mrs Suseela Nair            1998-1999
 Mrs Pushpa Leela Mahalingam 2000-2004
 Mrs Sumam Velayudhan        2005-2007
 Mrs Yogarathai C Nagalingam 2007-2011(May)
 Mr. Mohgan Shamugam 2011(June)-2015
 Mrs. Krishna Kumarie Dr. BaskeraRao Shastri   2015- Oct 2016
 Mr. Thangaperumal  Oct 2016 -

Buildings
There are 4 blocks in SMKV: Block A, B, C and D, and three halls.

Block A comprises:
 12 Classrooms (Pre-Form/Remove to Form 6)
 Chemistry Lab
 Physics Lab
 2 Staff Rooms
 Administrator's Office
 General School Office
 Principal's Office
 Prefect Room
 Band Room
 2 Sports Storerooms
 2 Kemahiran Hidup Workshops(Living Skills)
 Setting Room
 Store Room

Block B comprises:
 Single Classroom
 Art Room
 2 Science Labs
 Setting Room
 Library
 Computer Lab

Block C comprises:
 3 Classrooms

Block D comprises:
 Classroom
 Hall

Extracurricular activity
There are over 50 clubs in SMKV that students can participate in.

Sports

SMKV has several achievements in sports, notably in and athletics. Other sports include soccer, basketball, badminton, Hockey, handball, volleyball, tennis and table-tennis.

Houses
Four sports (Red, Blue, Green and Yellow) houses compete against each other on sports day which is held annually since 1960.

Uniformed services
Examples include:
 National Police Cadet (Malaysia) (Pasukan Kadet Polis Diraja Malaysia)
 Marching band (The VSS Band)
 Malaysian Red Crescent Society
 Persekutuan Pengakap Malaysia (Boy Scouts)
 Kadet Remaja Sekolah Malaysia (Malaysia School Youth Cadet Corps)
 Persatuan Pandu Puteri Malaysia (Girl Guides)
 Taekwando

Student Boards

Prefects
Vivekananda has the oldest prefects' board in Lembah Pantai. it was formed in 1n 1962
The maximum number of prefects in the board at any one time cannot exceed 20 in afternoon session and 40 in the morning session. There are Two Head of prefects one in the morning and one in afternoon

Librarians
There are about 20 librarians in the afternoon and around 35 in the morning, where the Head of Librarians is present for both morning and afternoon sessions.

"Teknopen" prefects
There are about 5 "Teknopen" prefects from Form 4 and 5 only, whose job is to maintain school computers & sound systems for the school

See also 
 List of schools in Malaysia

Secondary schools in Kuala Lumpur
Secondary schools in Malaysia